International Terminal railway station can refer to:

International Airport railway station, Sydney, Australia (Also known as International Terminal)
International Terminal railway station, Brisbane, Australia